Mark Singleton may refer to:

 Mark Singleton (actor) (1919–1986), British actor
 Mark Singleton (politician) (1762–1840), politician, Member of the Irish Parliament for Carysfort and of the UK Parliament for Eye
 Mark Singleton, former rhythm guitarist for the rock band Black Veil Brides
 Mark Singleton (yoga scholar) (born 1972), British academic at SOAS studying modern yoga and its origins

See also
 Singleton (disambiguation)